Having it all was a five-episode 2007 radio drama series on BBC Radio Scotland written by Jackie Bird and produced by The Comedy Unit.

Plot 
The plot of "having it all" revolves around Debbie (Michelle Gomez), her family - her teenage daughter named Lucy (Ellie Bird) and her ten-year-old son Oliver (Michael Kelly), and her friends - Janice (Cora Bissett) and Martin (Mark Cox).

Cast 
 Debbie - Michelle Gomez
 Janice - Cora Bissett
 Lucy - Ellie Bird
 Oliver - Michael Kelly
 Multiple Roles - Mark Cox
 Jim - Gavin Mitchell
Elsa- Julie Austin

References

External links 
 BBC Radio Scotland
 Comedy Unit

BBC Radio Scotland programmes
BBC Radio comedy programmes